Roxane Turcotte (born 1952) is a Canadian author of children's and youth literature. Born in Montreal, she lives in the Laurentians. Turcotte has written about forty books within the milieu of Quebec literature. She is the recipient of the 2017 Gaston Miron Excellence in French Award.

Biography
Roxane Turcotte is a graduate of the Université de Montréal in art history and education sciences. She is a French teacher and pedagogical advisor at the Commission scolaire de Montréal. Turcotte was nominated in 2006 for the Bravo award, for having included youth literature when teaching adult literacy learners and non-native-French-speakers, as well as for having participated in the first pajama story-telling sessions for infants in Montreal schools.

She creates and sporadically leads interactive literary workshops as part of the Quebec and Canada book fairs,  of the Centre national du livre de France and the  program of the Ministry of Culture and Communications of Quebec.

In 2006, she published her first youth novel, Le vol de la corneille, with Loup de Gouttière editions. She has subsequently published more than thirty children's books.

Awards and honours
 Francophonie selection of the 2019 Saint-Exupéry Prize for Bilou et la libraire du tonnerre
 2017 Gaston Miron Excellence in French Award

Selected works

 Emma et le tableau volé, 2021
 Énigme au Jardin botanique,, 2021
 Mystères au château Frontenac, 2020
 Le manoir aux secrets,, 2020
 Des voix d’épouvante,, 2020
 Sol ! Sol ! Sol !, 2020
 Adam, les fleurs et le voleur, 2019
 Bilou et la libraire du tonnerre, 2019
 Emma et la fête masquée,, 2019
 Le secret de Ratapatapan !, 2018
 Le lapin au grand cœur et Lulu Lustucru, 2018
 Plic, ploc !, 2018
 Raoul de Poupoupidou,, 2018 
 Saperlifourchette !, 2017
 Éloi et, le cheval de joie, 2017
 L’arc-en-ciel de la rivière, 2017
 Antoine Labelle, curé et  Roi du Nord, 2016
 Le piège de l’inconnue, 2016
 Miam, miam ! , 2016
 Le lapin au grand cœur, 2016
 Ça suffit, monsieur l’Ogre, 2015
 La perle des neiges, 2014
 La chasse au voleur, 2012
 Zébulon, le zèbre caméléon, 2012
 Marion et la vie qui bat, 2012
 Pic et le grand pin blanc, 2011       
 Crac ! Qui va là ?, 2011
 Max, débusqueur de secrets, 2011
 Girafe givrée, 2010
 Chevalier Poids-Plume, 2010
 Zoé et la sorcière, 2009
 Le Vol de la corneille, 2006

References

1952 births
Living people
Writers from Montreal
Canadian children's writers
Canadian women children's writers
Université de Montréal alumni